The Daring Dobermans is a 1973 film. It is a sequel to The Doberman Gang. It picks up right where its predecessor left off, with the six Doberman Pinschers in the wilderness that they headed to following a rogue Bulldog at nightfall.

See also
 List of American films of 1973

References

External links

 

1973 films
1970s crime comedy films
American sequel films
American crime comedy films
American independent films
Films about dogs
Films scored by Robert O. Ragland
1973 comedy films
Dimension Pictures films
1970s English-language films
1970s American films